Vicente Álvarez-Buylla Lozana (4 March 1890 - 27 November 1969) was a Spanish footballer, diplomat and writer.  He had three brothers, Benito, Plácido and Adolfo, with the first two also being writers and the latter two also being footballers.

Football career
Born in Asturias to a Spanish sociologist, pedagogue, jurist and professor of Krausism influence (Adolfo Álvarez-Buylla senior), he enjoyed his youth playing an relatively unknown sport who was growing incredibly fast in Spain called football. As a young man (15-21) he played football in Asturias, Madrid and Barcelona, at the clubs Stadium Avilesino, Madrid FC, Español de Madrid in Madrid and Espanyol in Barcelona. He reached the 1910 Copa del Rey Final (FEF) with Español de Madrid, in which he scored the opening two goals within the first 15 minutes, however, Barcelona made a comeback to win the title 3-2.

Diplomatic career
In 1914 he graduated in law at the University of Oviedo, earning a doctorate at the University of Madrid. In 1916 he won a position as a state lawyer, and in 1920 he joined the diplomatic corps, which did not prevent him from collaborating with the local press. In fact, he was a chronicler for Avilés newspapers and magazines in Barcelona and Madrid, mainly cultivating political journalism and publishing his writings in republican newspapers in Oviedo, such as La región or La República.

He was consul of Spain, assistant to Antonio Pla da Folgueira, in Tangier from 1924 to 1928. In 1928 he left the diplomatic career and returned to Spain, where he was appointed secretary of the Energy Council. In 1931 he was appointed director of administration in the Ministry of State and secretary of the Committee of Studies dedicated to the orientation of new diplomats, at the same time he held the secretariat of the Hydraulic Works Council. In 1933–34 he was a member of the Diplomatic Institute and the Center for Moroccan Studies. In 1936 he was appointed consul in London when Ramón Pérez de Ayala was ambassador. At the outbreak of the Spanish Civil War he remained faithful to republican legality.

At the end of the war, he remained in exile. From 1960 to 1962 he was minister delegate to the republican government in exile chaired by Emilio Herrera Linares.

References

1890 births
Spanish footballers
Association football forwards
Footballers from Oviedo
Real Madrid CF players
RCD Espanyol footballers
1969 deaths